Burnt Bay is a small bay in the northeast of Newfoundland. It opens on to the Bay of Exploits and Notre Dame Bay to the north.

Bays of Newfoundland and Labrador